Al Jamiatul Ashrafia is a Barelvi Sunni school in India. It is located in Mubarakpur in a northern state of India, Uttar Pradesh.

History
It started off as a madrasa called Misbah al-Ulum in 1898 in the town of Mubarakpur of what was then British India. It was named 'Ashrafia' after Syed Shah Ali Hussain Ashraf of Kichaucha. After struggling for many years and moving locations several times, a new building was constructed using funds raised by Hafiz Abd al-Aziz Muradabadi. This was the site for the school now known as Dar al-Ulum Ahl-i Sunnat or Misbah al-Ulum.

Realizing that the site was becoming too small, Hafiz Abd al-Aziz organized an educational conference in May 1972 to discuss for moving Ashrafia to a larger campus. Scholars of the Barelvi movement such as Mustafa Raza Khan son of Ahmad Raza Khan along with Sufi Syedul Ulema Maulana Syed Ale Mustafa Quadri Barkati  and Allama Arshadul Qaudri laid the foundation stone with the mission of making it a university for Sunni Hanafi Islamic Ideology in 1972 at a site outside the city of Azamgarh. Key figures such as Allama Ziyaul Mustafa, Allama Arshadul Qaudri, Allama Mumtaz Ahmad Ashraful Qadri, Mufti Abdul Mannan, Maulana Shafi, Qari Yehya and Qamaruzzaman Azmi worked with Abd al-Aziz Muradabadi to raise the required funds to build the institution.

About the institution
The Jamia has 5000 plus students in religious education centers with 256 faculty members and employees. Besides them there are more than 6000 boys and girls in various educational institutions of the Jamia. The alumni are called ‘Misbahi’ according to its old name ‘Misbahul Uloom’. Mohammad Shahid Raza Khan, an alumnus of Al Jamiatul Ashrafia qualified Indian Civil Service Exam in 2019.

Affiliation  
The degrees of graduation and post graduation of Al Jamiatul Ashrafia are recognized by various universities including Maulana Azad National Urdu University Hyderabad, Jawahar Lal Nehru University (JNU), Jamia Millia Islamia, and Aligarh Muslim University.

Set up of Sunni Board
In 1992, under the auspices of Al Jamiatul Ashrafia, Mobarakpur, the Jurisprudential Board was set up as a body of Muftis.

See also
Karwan-I-Islami
Jamia Nizamia 
Jamiatur Raza
Islam in India
Al-Jame-atul-Islamia
Manzar-e-Islam

References

 

Islamic universities and colleges in India
1898 establishments in India
Madrasas in India
Barelvi Islamic universities and colleges